Marie Pavie (fl. 1600) was a calligrapher active in France at the beginning of the seventeenth century and possibly the first woman to have published a copybook, Le premier essay de la plume de Marie Pavie,  under her own name.

Life & work

Pavie, along with Dutch calligrapher Maria Strick, the other contender for the position of first woman to publish a copybook under her own name, were part of a vanishingly small group of professional early-modern women calligraphers. Little is known about Pavie's life and there are only two copies of her book extant, and one of those partial: the Newberry Library in Chicago holds the only known complete copy, and the Bibliothèque nationale de France in Paris has some leaves. Copybooks tended to receive heavy usage and many have not survived.

References

Bibliography
 Mediavilla, Claude. History of French calligraphy. Paris: 2006, p.192.
 Le premier essay de la plume de Marie Pavie. S.l., 1608. 4° obl., 25 pl. (Newberry Library, Chicago: Wing ZW 639.P283, 15 pl. Available online).

See also
 List of female calligraphers

16th-century calligraphers
17th-century calligraphers
French calligraphers
Women calligraphers